Matthew Urango, known professionally as Cola Boyy, is a musician and activist based in Oxnard, California. His music has been described as belonging to the disco genre. NME compared his sound to “a disco ball melting or the after-effects of some particularly potent hallucinogenics”.

His debut EP, Black Boogie Neon, was released in 2018. His debut album, Prosthetic Boombox was released in 2021. Urango has toured and collaborated with MGMT.

Early life 
Urango was born with spina bifida, kyphosis and scoliosis, as well as a club foot to a white mother and a father of Chumash, African-American and Mexican ancestry. He describes himself as Afro-Latino.

He has a twin brother, who is non-disabled.

Urango describes himself as having "basically taught myself" to play piano at his grandmother's house as a child. In high school he played in punk bands, playing his first backyard show aged 17. After graduating from high school, he searched for work but experienced discrimination due to his disability. He eventually found employment at Walmart, but was hospitalised with pneumonia due to being pushed to overwork by his employer. As a result of this episode of illness he qualified for disability welfare payments.

Music career 
Before Cola Boyy, Urango played second guitar for indie pop band Sea Lions. Urango released the single "Penny Girl" in July 2018. The track was ranked #72 in Fader Magazine's "100 best songs of 2018".

In August 2018, "Buggy Tip" premiered on Vice's Noisey.

He released his debut EP, Black Boogie Neon, in September 2018.  The EP includes earlier releases "Penny Girl" and "Buggy Tip".

The name of the EP comes from an early demo track about a fictional club of the same name where disabled people can enjoy themselves free from ableist stigma. In the video for "Beige 70", filmed at the real-life Le Peripate club in Paris, Urango is portrayed in this club as a part of a diverse cast of club-goers. Explaining the song's meaning, Urango said: “It’s a love song about a girl at a club whose clothes are shabby and her friends are making fun of her, but it doesn’t matter to me because she’s a star. It’s about being judged and accepted.”.

In 2019, Urango performed at Pitchfork Paris.

In April 2021, Urango released single "Kid Born in Space", featuring MGMT. Urango revealed in a press release that the song is about his experience growing up as a disabled person: “The song is me explaining to my younger self to let go of worries about people staring or not understanding. Everyone has their struggles, and problems that shape them.”

The debut Cola Boyy album, Prosthetic Boombox, was released by the French label Record Makers in June 2021. The album features appearances from Nicolas Godin of Air and Andrew VanWyngarden. Paste gave the album a positive review, describing it as "an electrifying, catchy and colorful debut." The Guardian gave the album 4 out of 5 stars, describing the record as a "delirious blast of disco, funk, house and psychedelia."

Activism 
Multiple features about Cola Boyy as a musician have made reference to his left-wing activism, which he became involved in around the time he began making music as Cola Boyy. Urango became politicised after participating in a radical reading group that he was invited to by a friend. Since then he has organised with Todo Poder Al Pueblo, a collective that advocates for immigrants and workers in Urango's home-city of Oxnard. He is also a member of APOC (Anarchist People of Color), which helps to organise free punk rock concerts accessible to all ages.

Urango has stated that he wants to convey his anti-capitalist political views through his music. However, he forgoes the more traditional medium of punk rock in order to reach a wider audience. Speaking to NME, he said, “I have my beliefs and my messages that I want to get across to as many people as possible so obviously I’m going to do that through pop because it’s so positive.”

References 

Living people
People with cerebral palsy
People with spina bifida
American activists of Mexican descent
Singers from California
Musicians from Oxnard, California
Chumash people
American people of indigenous peoples descent
Year of birth missing (living people)